is a one-shot shōjo manga by Tomoko Taniguchi. It was serialised in Jitsugyo no Nihon Sha's manga magazine, My Birthday, in 1990. Jitsugyo no Nihon Sha released the manga in September 1990. It was licensed in North America by Central Park Media, which was released in 2000. The manga was republished on April 1, 2008.

References

External links

Sequential Tart review 1
Sequential Tart review 2
Publishers Weekly review

1990 manga
CPM Press
Jitsugyo no Nihon Sha manga
One-shot manga
School life in anime and manga
Shōjo manga